Year 231 (CCXXXI) was a common year starting on Saturday (link will display the full calendar) of the Julian calendar. At the time, it was known as the Year of the Consulship of Claudius and Sallustus (or, less frequently, year 984 Ab urbe condita). The denomination 231 for this year has been used since the early medieval period, when the Anno Domini calendar era became the prevalent method in Europe for naming years.

Events 
 By place 
 Roman Empire 
 Emperor Alexander Severus accompanies his mother Julia Mamaea to Syria, and campaigns against the Persians. Military command rests in the hands of his generals, but his presence gives additional weight to the empire's policy.

 China 
 March–August – Battle of Mount Qi: The Chinese state of Shu Han gains a tactical victory, and the state of Cao Wei a strategic victory.

 By topic 
 Religion 
 Origen, disciple of Ammonius Saccas, founder of Neoplatonism, is exiled in Caesarea.

Births 
 Cao Xun, Chinese prince of the Cao Wei state (d. 244)

Deaths 
 Cao Zhen, Chinese general of the Cao Wei state
 Li Hui (or De'ang), Chinese official and politician 
 Zhang He, Chinese general of the Cao Wei state

References